Castillo San Felipe del Morro, also known as El Morro, is a citadel built between 16th and 18th centuries in San Juan, Puerto Rico.

Development
Lying on the northwesternmost point of the islet of Old San Juan, Castillo San Felipe del Morro is named in honor of King Philip II of Spain. The fortification, also referred to as el Morro or 'the promontory,' was designed to guard the entrance to the San Juan Bay, and defend the Spanish colonial port city of San Juan from seaborne enemies.

In 1983, the citadel was declared a World Heritage Site by the United Nations in conjunction with the San Juan National Historic Site. Over two million visitors a year explore the castillo, making it one of Puerto Rico's leading tourist attractions. Facing the structure, on the opposite side of the bay, a smaller fortification known as El Cañuelo complemented the castillo's defense of the entrance to the bay.

Structure for deployment

The construction of the citadel and its surrounding walls began in 1539 on orders of King Charles V of Spain. The original fortress was built under the direction of conquistador Diego Ramos de Orozco and its main purpose was to defend the port of San Juan by controlling the entry to its harbor. In order to have a viable defense while the rest of the fort was being completed, a small proto-fortress was erected during the first year of construction. It is estimated that this section comprises about 10% of the whole structure.

It was not till 1587, however, that Field Marshal Juan de Tejeda and the Italian engineer-architect Juan Bautista Antonelli drew the fort's final design.  The plan, which was based on the then firmly established Spanish military fortification principles of the time, included fortifying nine other sites in the Spanish Main and Spanish West Indies: Santo Domingo, Santa Marta, Cartagena,  Nombre de Dios, Portobelo, the Chagres River, Panama City, Havana, and St. Augustine.  San Juan construction began in March 1589 with skilled artisans, 12 stonecutters, 18 masons, 2 smiths, a cooper, metal founder, and an overseer assigned to the task, with the help of 150 slaves.  Captain General Diego Menéndez de Valdés, who was the governor of Puerto Rico, took over construction after Tejeda and Antonelli left to start construction of Santo Domingo's fortifications.  Capt. Pedro de Salazar took over construction in 1591.

The new fortifications consisted of a hornwork, crossing the headland, to protect the landward side of the existing tower and water battery.  Two half-bastions, one on the Atlantic side called "Tejeda", and another on the harbor side called "Austria", were connected by a curtain wall fronted by a moat, and spanned by a drawbridge in the center.  The gate and drawbridge were protected by a ravelin, and just inside the gate was a guardhouse.  A pair of batteries behind the hornwork overlooked the sea and harbor.

In 1634, construction of the city walls surrounding San Juan began.  By 1650, the town was enclosed on the east, south and west, while natural battlements protected the city along the Atlantic.

In 1765, Alejandro O'Reilly, Inspector General of Cuba, and Colonel Tomás O'Daly, San Juan Chief of Engineers, agreed on a plan to strengthen San Juan's defenses, which was approved by Charles III of Spain.  San Juan became a Defense of the First Order, and one of the most powerful plazas in the Americas by 1790.  El Morro's improvements included 3 cisterns under the main plaza containing 216,000 gallons of water collected from times of rain.  The walls were strengthened to be 18–40 feet thick.  These walls consisted of limestone and sandstone blocks forming the exterior and interior, with rubble sandwiched in between.  The Santa Bárbara battery became the main battery with 37 cannon, supported by casemate guns at a lower level, and backed by a great wall with casemates at a higher level.

The top of the Castillo de San Felipe del Morro Lighthouse was destroyed during the 1898 bombardment of the city by the United States, and the American flag replaced the Spanish on 18 November 1898.

History

Spanish Rule (1539–1898)

Upon the advice of Gonzalo Fernández de Oviedo y Valdés, a battery was constructed on the rocky promontory called "the Morro", when the location of La Fortaleza was deemed unsuitable.  This battery consisted of a tower with 4 embrasures, and a Water Battery at the foot of the slope for 3 guns.  By 1555, Morro had 8 bronze cannons, as a defense against French privateers.

During the Spanish government of the island, El Morro, also known as Castillo de San Felipe, survived several attacks from foreign powers on various occasions.

In 1593 Portuguese soldiers, sent from Lisbon by order of Phillip II, composed the first garrison of the San Felipe del Morro fortress in Puerto Rico. Some brought their wives, while others married Puerto Rican women, and today there are many Puerto Rican families with Portuguese last names.

In 1595, Englishman Sir Francis Drake unsuccessfully attacked San Juan with his fleet in the Battle of San Juan (1595).

In 1598, the English attacked again, led by George Clifford, 3rd Earl of Cumberland. Clifford succeeded because he attacked San Juan over land instead of trying to enter through the San Juan Bay. However, an epidemic of dysentery forced him to flee the island after the Battle of San Juan (1598).

In 1625, the Dutch, led by Boudewijn Hendricksz, also attacked the island emulating George Clifford's overland invasion. To the amazement of the citizens, the invaders were able to pass in front of the castle's defenders and into the harbor, out of reach of the city's cannons. El Morro managed to resist the siege and eventually made the Dutch retire, although the attackers were able to sack and burn the city before leaving the Battle of San Juan (1625).

In 1797, British General Ralph Abercromby and Admiral Henry Harvey, with a force of 7,000–13,000 men, invaded the island of Puerto Rico. Captain General Don Ramón de Castro and his forces repelled the attack. Abercromby and Harvey were defeated in the Battle of San Juan (1797).

El Morro's last active fight occurred during a naval bombardment by the United States Navy during the 1898 Spanish–American War, ending the age of naval warfare in the Caribbean, at least in the classical sense. During the Spanish–American War, the castle was attacked at least three times by American naval forces, the largest being the Bombardment of San Juan on May 12, 1898. The war ended with the signing of the Treaty of Paris, in which Spain ceded ownership of the islands of Puerto Rico, Cuba, Guam, and the Philippines to the United States.

American military occupation (1898–1961)
El Morro and many other Spanish government buildings in Old San Juan became part of a large U.S. Army post, called Fort Brooke. In the early 20th century, the U.S. military filled up the esplanade (the green space in front of "El Morro") with baseball diamonds, hospitals, officers' quarters, an officers' club and even a golf course.

On March 21, 1915, Lt. Teófilo Marxuach was the officer of the day at the El Morro fortress. The Odenwald (built in 1903 and not to be confused with the German World War II warship of the same name) was an armed German supply ship which tried to force its way out of the bay and deliver supplies to the German submarines waiting in the Atlantic Ocean. Lt. Marxuach gave the order to open fire on the ship, which was forced to return; its supplies were confiscated.  The shots ordered by Lt. Marxuach are widely regarded to be the first shots fired by the United States in World War I, although the first actual wartime shot fired by the U.S. came on the day war was declared, during the scuttling of the SMS Cormoran off Guam.

During World War II the United States Army added a massive concrete bunker to the top of El Morro to serve as a Harbor Defense Fire Control Station to direct a network of coastal artillery sites, and to keep watch for German submarines which were ravaging shipping in the Caribbean. A lighthouse, rebuilt by the U.S. Army in 1906–08 is the tallest point on El Morro, standing 180 feet (55 m) above sea level. Flagpoles on El Morro today customarily fly the United States flag, the Puerto Rican flag and the Cross of Burgundy flag, also known in Spanish as las Aspas de Borgoña, a standard which was widely used by Spanish armies around the world from 1506 to 1785.

National Park (1961–present)

In 1961, the United States Army officially retired from El Morro. The fort became a part of the National Park Service to be preserved as museums. In 1983, the Castillo and the city walls were declared a World Heritage Site by the United Nations. In honor of the Quincentennial of the voyages of Columbus in 1992 the exterior esplanade was cleared of palm trees that had been planted by the U.S. Army in the Fort Brooke era, and restored to the open appearance this "field-of-fire" for El Morro's cannon would have had in colonial Spanish times. Parking lots and paved roads were also removed, and the El Morro lighthouse repaired and restored to its original appearance. El Morro was used as a film set in the 1996 motion picture Amistad. Steven Spielberg used it to represent a fort in Sierra Leone where African slaves were auctioned in 1839. African slave labor was used in addition to local labor to help build the castillo. El Morro was a defensive military fortification and a major component of San Juan's harbor defense system. Puerto Rico as such was considered by the Spanish crown as the "Key to the Antilles"; no enemy ship could navigate its waters without fear of capture.

An annual artisans festival is held at the fort every July.

Historical timeline

1508 – Spanish colonized the area
1509 – Spanish settlers from Caparra found San Juan.
1539 – Construction of the first harbor defenses at El Morro and La Fortaleza authorized by King Charles V.
1587 – Engineers Juan de Tejada and Juan Bautista Antonelli lay out the main design for El Morro still seen today.
1589 – Governor Diego Menéndez de Valdés begins new construction at El Morro.
1595 – Sir Francis Drake attacks El Morro unsuccessfully by sea. Gunners from El Morro shoot a cannonball through the cabin of Drake's flagship. To impede Drake's ships from entering the bay, a metal chain was drawn across the entrance. Drake was defeated and many of his ships sunk.
1598 – George Clifford, Duke of Cumberland, attacks from the land side in June of this year, the only time El Morro was taken in battle. English forces move into the fortress, however weakened by dysentery they leave in November.
1625 – The Dutch under the command of Captain Balduino Enrico (also known as Boudewijn Hendricksz/Bowdoin Henrick) attacked and invaded San Juan from the "La Puntilla". El Morro held out under the leadership of Spanish Governor De Haro and Captain Juan de Amézqueta of the Puerto Rican militia, but the city was sacked and burned.
1630 – Governor Enrique Enríquez de Sotomayor begins construction of the city walls. Work continues until 1678 to encircle the city completely.
1765 – After the siege of Havana in 1762 by the British, King Charles III appoints Field Marshal Alejandro O'Reilly (Alexander O'Reilly) and Royal Engineer Tomás O'Daly (Thomas O'Daly) to reform San Juan's fortifications and reorganize the garrison to make the city a "Defense of the First Order".
1787 – An earthquake damages the structure of both San Felipe del Morro and San Cristóbal.
1797 – General Ralph Abercromby and Admiral Henry Harvey, with a force of 7,000–13,000 men, invaded the island of Puerto Rico. Captain General Don Ramón de Castro and his forces repelled the attack. Abercromby and Harvey were defeated. This was to be one of the largest invasions to Spanish territories in the Americas.
1825 – Well known Puerto Rican pirate, Roberto Cofresí was jailed and later executed within the fort's walls.
1843 – First lighthouse in Puerto Rico constructed atop the castle.
1898 – On 12 May, US Navy warships shell El Morro in a day-long bombardment, damaging the tip of the main battery. Six months later, Puerto Rico becomes U.S. territory by terms of the Treaty of Paris which ends the Spanish–American War.
1899 – The Department of the Navy rebuilds the lighthouse tower as an octagonal reinforced concrete structure using the iron structure as reinforcement. A new lenticular lens is installed. By 1906 a crack, through and around the top of the tower, directly under the lantern requires its demolition.
1908 – Present lighthouse seen atop El Morro built by the United States Navy.
1915 – First shots of World War I fired by Lt. Teófilo Marxuach on behalf of the United States. Marxuach, a native of Arroyo, Puerto Rico, fired what is considered to be the first shot of World War I fired by the regular armed forces of the United States against any ship flying the colors of the Central Powers. Marxuach, who was a member of the "Porto Rico Regiment of Infantry" and Officer of the Day, on 25 March 1915, opened fire on the Odenwald, an armed German supply vessel, as it was trying to force its way out of San Juan's bay.
1942 – El Morro was still an active military post during World War II. The U.S. Army added concrete artillery observation posts and an underground bunker to El Morro to defend against possible German attacks.
1949 – San Juan National Historic Site is established.
1961 – The U.S. Army moves out of the forts of Old San Juan, and they become the jurisdiction of the United States National Park Service, to be preserved solely as museums.
1983 – San Juan National Historic Site declared a World Heritage Site by the United Nations.

1992 – El Morro's grounds are returned to their historic 18th-century appearance as part of quincentennial commemoration of the discovery of Puerto Rico by Christopher Columbus when modern roadways and parking lots are removed. El Morro now generates tourism revenue by being open to tours. Also in 1992, Plaza del Quinto Centenario is built across Castillo San Felipe del Morro.
2017- Puerto Rico was struck by Hurricane Maria on September 20, 2017 devastating the infrastructure of the island as well as the tourism industry.  Tourism to the Castle of San Felipe or  had recovered by the summer of 2019

Gallery

See also

Puerto Rico Campaign
Fuerte de San José
List of the oldest buildings in Puerto Rico

References

External links

Photo Gallery
Las Líneas de Defensa de San Juan, Compilation by Johnny Torres Rivera
Las defensas de San Juan 1898, Compilation by Luis M. Iriarte Rota

San Juan National Historic Site
16th-century establishments in Puerto Rico
Spanish Colonial architecture in Puerto Rico
Citadels